Zhenping (Mandarin: 镇坪乡) is a township in Songpan County, Ngawa Tibetan and Qiang Autonomous Prefecture, Sichuan, China. In 2010, Zhenping Township had a total population of 3,393: 1,712 males and 1,681 females: 773 aged under 14, 2,408 aged between 15 and 65 and 212 aged over 65.

References 

Township-level divisions of Sichuan
Songpan County